Dinamo Volgograd is a Russian women's handball club from Volgograd. Founded in 1972 as Burevestnik Volgograd, it represented Rotor Volgograd following the collapse of the Soviet Union and was subsequently named Aqva before taking its current name in 2003.

Dynamo is the most successful team in the Russian Super League with nine titles, and in the 2001-02 season it set a record winning all the matches. It in international competitions won three titles: the 1995 Challenge Cup and Champions Trophy and the 2008 EHF Cup. In 2000 it became the first Russian team to reach the Champions League's semifinals since the USSR's break-up.

In reaction to the 2022 Russian invasion of Ukraine, the International Handball Federation banned Russian athletes, and the European Handball Federation suspended the  Russian clubs from competing in European handball competitions.

Honours
 Women's EHF Cup
Winners (1): 2008
 Women's EHF Challenge Cup
Winners (1): 1995
 EHF Women's Champions Trophy
Winners (1): 1995
 Russian League
Winners (12): 1993, 1995, 1996, 1999, 2000, 2001, 2009, 2010, 2011, 2012, 2013, 2014

European record

Team

Current squad
Squad for the 2020-21 season.

Goalkeeper
 1  Anna Vereshchak
 12  Ekaterina Karabutova
 26  Maria Duvakina
 50  Nadezhda Kolesnikova
LW
 2  Ekaterina Litvnova
 8  Anzhelika Lebdeva
RW
 3  Ekaterina Mayorova 
 13  Anastasia Starshova
 33  Anna Sheina
Line player
 24  Tatiana Medvedeva
 33  Elena Dukart
 67  Victoria Turushina
 81  Daria Stasenko

Back players
LB
 7  Olesya Goryachenko
 11  Ksenia Zubova
 17  Stefania Belolipetskaya
 49  Oksana Kolodyazhnaya
CB
 9  Sofia Krakhmaleva
 36  Ekaterina Dolmatova
 56  Ekaterina Skivko
 77  Elizaveta Dudkina
RB
 24  Elina Sidnina
 99  Sofia Lyzhina

Notable players

 Viktoriya Borshchenko
 Anastasiya Pidpalova
 Viktoriya Tymoshenkova
 Jaqueline Anastácio
 Mayssa Pessoa
 Asma Elghaoui
 Karyna Yezhykava
 Katty Piejos
 Nadezda Muravyeva
 Elena Fomina
 Liudmila Bodnieva 
 Yelena Avdekova
 Maya Petrova
 Daria Dmitrieva
 Olga Levina
 Ksenia Makeeva
 Antonina Skorobogatchenko
 Anna Sedoykina
 Yelena Polenova
 Anna Punko
 Aleksandra Stepanova
 Anastasia Suslova
 Polina Vedekhina
 Valentina Vernigorova
 Polina Vyakhireva
 Tatiana Khmyrova
 Anna Kochetova
 Yaroslava Frolova

References

External links
 Official site

Dynamo Volgograd
Dynamo